Cvent Holding Corp. is a publicly held software-as-a-service (SaaS) company based in Tysons Corner, Virginia, that specializes in meetings, events, and hospitality management technology by offering; web-based software for in-person, virtual, and hybrid events, including online event registration, venue selection, event marketing and management, virtual and onsite, and attendee engagement. Cvent  also offers software for hotels and venues to manage group and corporate travel business and attract group business through its sourcing platforms. Buyout firm Blackstone Inc (BX.N) agreed to purchase U.S. cloud-based event-software provider Cvent Holding Corp (CVT.O) in a deal valued at $4.6 billion on 14th March 2023.

Operations 
Cvent is headquartered in Tysons Corner, Virginia, a suburb of Washington D.C., with other U.S. offices in Texas, Oregon, Utah, and Virginia. International Cvent offices include Canada, the United Kingdom, and India. 

Cvent trades on the Nasdaq Global Market under the stock symbol CVT.

Leadership 

 Reggie Aggarwal: CEO and Founder. Reggie attended the University of Virginia and graduated with a degree in finance. Reggie graduated from Washington and Lee University School of Law in 1994 with a Juris Doctor degree, after which he worked as an attorney specializing in the M&A and IPO process. Prior to co-founding Cvent in 1999, Reggie served as the president of the Indian CEO Network. EY named Reggie Entrepreneur of the Year for the Mid-Atlantic Region in 2009. In 2018 and 2019 Reggie was named the number one influential SaaS CEO by the SaaS Report.
 Chuck Ghoorah: Co-Founder, President of Worldwide Sales and Marketing
 David Quattrone: Co-Founder, Chief Technology Officer
 Billy Newman: Chief Financial Officer, Senior Vice President
 Patrick Smith: Chief Marketing Officer, Senior Vice President

History
Cvent was founded in September 1999 by Reggie Aggarwal. At its founding, Cvent had an initial staff of six individuals working in technology, business, and marketing.

In 1999, Cvent received US$17 million in venture capital and grew its staff to 125 employees.

In April 2001, Cvent had 300 customers, including MCO WorldCom, McDonald’s, Princeton University, University of Virginia, Ernst & Young, and Hughes Network Systems.

Following the dot-com bubble burst and the September 11 attacks, Cvent faced near-bankruptcy and was forced to cut 80% of its staff. The company became profitable again by 2003.

In 2011, Cvent was growing by 50% a year and received $136 million of funding from New Enterprise Associates in July 2011, which, at the time, was the largest investment in a U.S. software company since 2007.

Cvent filed an S-1 with the U.S. Securities and Exchange Commission on July 8, 2013, proposing an initial public offering of 5.6 million shares. The company went public on the New York Stock Exchange on August 9, 2013, at an initial price of $21. Cvent raised $117.6 million and received a market capitalization of over $1 billion. The IPO was referenced in regard to its use of the JOBS Act, which enabled the company to quickly offer an IPO.

In 2016, the company was acquired by venture capital company Vista Equity Partners for $1.65 billion. Ashok Trivedi, the co-founder of Mastech Digital and iGate was an early investor of the company.

On July 20, 2021, WSJ reported that Cvent Nears $5-Billion-Plus SPAC(DGNS) Deal.

Following the close of a merger deal with Dragoneer Growth Opportunities Corp. II, a special purpose acquisition company (SPAC), Cvent went public on the Nasdaq Global Market. on December 9, 2021. In March 2023, Cvent agreed to be taken private again by Blackstone Inc. in a $4.6billion deal that includes a significant minority investment from the Abu Dhabi Investment Authority.

Acquisitions 

 On June 13, 2012, Cvent announced the acquisition of Austin-based startup CrowdTorch, previously known as Seed Labs, for $4.2 million. On December 7, 2015, Vendini announced they acquired CrowdTorch from Cvent. 
 On June 19, 2012, Cvent announced its acquisition of Portland-based application developer CrowdCompass for $10 million.
 On May 23, 2018, Cvent announced that it had acquired Quickmobile, a Vancouver-based mobile event app developer.
 On June 5, 2018, Cvent announced that it had acquired Kapow, an online booking platform for venues and experiences. Cvent has since sold Kapow, which is currently a division of Hello! Destination Management.
 On October 16, 2018, Cvent announced that it had acquired Social Tables, an event diagramming, seating, and collaboration platform based in Washington, D.C.
 On May 22, 2019, Cvent announced that it had acquired Wedding Spot, a wedding venue sourcing platform that allows users to find venues based on budget, location, style, and guest count. At the time of the acquisition, Wedding Spot, which was founded in 2013 in San Francisco, California, had partnerships with over 12,000 venues across the United States.
 On June 10, 2019, Cvent announced that it had acquired mobile event technology provider DoubleDutch.
 On July 20, 2021, WSJ reported that Cvent Nears $5-Billion-Plus SPAC(DGNS) Deal. 
 One June 1, 2022, Cvent acquired UK-based VenueDirectory.

Software and services
Cvent’s current products are listed under three categories, Event Marketing & Management, Exchange, and Suppliers & Venues.

In July 2000, Cvent introduced its first SaaS product, a web-based tool for event planners to manage invitations and collect registration fees. In 2006, it introduced a product for conducting online surveys, which was followed by the introduction of the Cvent Supplier Network two years later. The Supplier Network is an online marketing place that connects meeting planners with venues and services. In 2009, the company began offering professional services.

Cvent produces the Destination Guide an online travel guide designed for meeting planners with information about 800 different destinations.

References

Companies based in McLean, Virginia
Cloud applications
Cloud computing providers
2013 initial public offerings
2016 mergers and acquisitions
Private equity portfolio companies
Software companies established in 1999
Software companies based in Virginia
Software companies of the United States
1999 establishments in Virginia
 Announced mergers and acquisitions